Knockalton may refer to the following places in the Republic of  Ireland:

Knockalton Lower
Knockalton Upper